Ou Samrel is a khum (commune) of Samlout District in Battambang Province in north-western Cambodia.

Villages

 Ou Rumchek Kraom
 Ou Rumchek Leu
 Chamlang Romeang Kraom
 Chamlang Romeang leu
 Ou Samrael Kraom
 Ou Samrael Leu

References

Communes of Battambang province
Samlout District